Antonio Angelucci (born 16 September 1944) is an Italian politician and entrepreneur.

As an entrepreneur he works in healthcare (the chain of structures that belong to the San Raffaele Roman hospital), in real estate and publishing (Il Tempo, Corriere dell'Umbria, and Libero (through a foundation).

Biography
He was born in Sante Marie, province of L'Aquila, on 16 April 1944. He has been elected deputy for The People of Freedom in the IV circumscription (Lombardy 2) in 2008. During his political career, Angelucci was member of several parliamentary boards: the VI board (Finance) and the X board (Productive activities, trade and tourism).

As of 2016, he has been absent from parliament 99.59% of the time, most likely the most in any western democracies.

Notes

1944 births
Living people
The People of Freedom politicians
Forza Italia (2013) politicians